This is a listing of notable people born in, or notable for their association with the U.S. state of Alabama.



A

 Hank Aaron, Hall of Fame Major League Baseball player (Mobile)
 Ralph Abernathy, civil rights leader, Baptist Minister (Linden)
 Act of Congress musical group
 Austin Adams, MLB pitcher, Cleveland Indians (Montgomery)
 Mario Addison, NFL player, Carolina Panthers (Birmingham)
 Robert Aderholt, representative from Alabama's 4th congressional district since 1997 (Haleyville)
 Tommie Agee, MLB player (Magnolia)
 Tommie Agee, former NFL player, Dallas Cowboys (Maplesville)
 Daniel Alarcón, novelist (Birmingham)
 David Donald Albritton, Olympic medalist and politician (Danville)
 Doyle Alexander, MLB player (Cordova)
 Chalmers Alford, musician (Huntsville)
 James B. Allen, U.S. senator (1969–1978) (Gadsden)
 Jason Allen, NFL player (Muscle Shoals)
 Jonathan Allen, NFL player, Washington Commanders (Anniston)
 Maryon Pittman Allen, U.S. senator (1978) (Gadsden and Birmingham)
 Mel Allen, sportscaster, Alabama football and New York Yankees (Birmingham)
 Viola Allen, stage actress (Huntsville)
 Bobby Allison, NASCAR driver (Hueytown)
 Davey Allison, NASCAR driver (Hueytown)
 David Allison, professor at University of Alabama at Birmingham (Birmingham)
 Donnie Allison, NASCAR driver (Hueytown)
 John Amari, circuit judge and former member of both houses of the Alabama legislature (Trussville)
 Mary Anderson, actress (Birmingham)
 Ray Anderson, boxer (Anniston)
 Glenn Andrews, U.S. representative (1965–1967) (Anniston)
 Ivy Andrews, MLB player (Dora)
 Sheila Andrews, country music singer (Athens)
 John Archibald, Pulitzer-prize-winning journalist, author (Birmingham)
 Anthony J. Arduengo, III, chemist, material scientist, professor at University of Alabama (Tuscaloosa)
 R.G. Armstrong, actor (Birmingham)
 Lloyd Austin, Secretary of Defense nominee (Mobile, Alabama)
 Ethel Ayler, actress (Whistler)

B

 Spencer Bachus, representative from Alabama's 6th congressional district 1993–2015 (Vestavia Hills)
 Mary Badham, actress (Birmingham)
 David Baker, activist (Anniston)
 Locy Baker, Alabama House of Representatives 1994–2010 (Abbeville)
 Hank Ballard, singer (Bessemer)
 Tallulah Bankhead, actress (Jasper)
 Charles Barkley, Hall of Fame basketball player, television commentator (Leeds)
 Reggie Barlow, NFL wide receiver, college football coach (Montgomery)
 Desi Barmore (born 1960), American-Israeli basketball player
 Mark Barron, NFL player, St. Louis Rams (Mobile)
 Inez Baskin, African American journalist and civil rights activist (Florala)
 Cynthia Bathurst, animal activist, founder of Safe Humane Chicago and the Court Case Dog Program
 Bill Baxley, lieutenant governor (Dothan)
 Lucy Baxley, lieutenant governor (2003–2007) (Vestavia Hills)
 Colter Bean, former MLB player, New York Yankees (Birmingham)
 Paul Bearer, WWE manager and wrestling promoter (Mobile)
 Jere Beasley, born in Tyler, Texas, lieutenant governor (1971–1979) (Clayton)
 Killer Beaz (born Truett Beasley Jr.), stand-up comedian (Andalusia)
 Scott Beason, Alabama state senator (2006–2014) (Hartselle)
 Barry Beckett, keyboardist, composer, record producer, original member of Muscle Shoals Rhythm Section (Muscle Shoals)
 Ann Bedsole, member of both houses, consecutively, of the Alabama State Legislature 1979 to 1995 (Mobile)
 Regina Benjamin, Surgeon General of the United States (Mobile)
 Earl Bennett, NFL wide receiver (Birmingham)
 Amber Benson, actress (Birmingham)
 Bo Bice, singer, American Idol runner-up (Huntsville)
 Michael Biehn, actor (Anniston)
 James Gillespie Birney (1792–1857), planter, attorney, abolitionist (Huntsville)
 Sanford Bishop, U.S. representative from Georgia's 2nd congressional district (Mobile)
 Hugo Black, U.S. senator, United States Supreme Court justice (Harlan)
 Lucas Black, actor (Speake)
 Thomas Edwin Blanton Jr., white supremacist and co-conspirator in the 16th Street Baptist Church bombing (Birmingham)
 Eric Bledsoe, NBA player, Milwaukee Bucks (Birmingham)
 Winton Blount, businessman, U.S. postmaster general (1969–1972) (Union Springs)
 Michael Boley, NFL linebacker (Gadsden)
 Jo Bonner, representative from Alabama's 1st congressional district (2003–2013) (Mobile)
 Neil Bonnett, NASCAR driver (Hueytown)
 Margaret Boozer, sculptor (Anniston)
 Young Boozer, state treasurer (Montgomery)
 Stephen "tWitch" Boss, freestyle hip-hop dancer, entertainer, and actor (Montgomery)
 Th-resa Bostick, IFBB professional bodybuilder (Birmingham)
 Albert Boutwell, lieutenant governor (1959–1963), mayor of Birmingham (1963–1967) (Birmingham)
 Bobby Bowden, college football coach, Florida State (Birmingham)
 Larry Bowie, former NFL player, Washington Redskins (Anniston)
 Frank W. Boykin, former U.S. representative (Bladon Springs)
 Robert Bradley's Blackwater Surprise, music group (Evergreen)
 Rick Bragg, Pulitzer Prize-winning author (Possum Trot)
 Debbie Bramwell-Washington, IFBB professional bodybuilder (Birmingham)
 Jeff Brantley, MLB player, ESPN sportscaster
 Albert P. Brewer, governor (1968–1971) (Birmingham)
 Jeff Briggs, businessman, video game pioneer (Florence)
 Bobby Bright, mayor of Montgomery (1999–2009), representative from Alabama's 2nd congressional district (2009–2011) (Montgomery)
 Eric Brock, former NFL player (Alexander City)
 David G. Bronner, CEO for Retirement Systems of Alabama (Montgomery), born in Cresco, Iowa
 Mo Brooks, representative from Alabama's 5th congressional district since 2011 (Huntsville)
 Janice Rogers Brown, U.S. Court of Appeals judge (Luverne)
 Jerry Dolyn Brown, folk artist, traditional potter (Hamilton)
 Johnny Mack Brown, football player for Alabama, actor (Dothan)
 Mary Ward Brown, short story writer and memoirist,  (Hamburg)
 Michael Brown, astronomer (Huntsville)
 Roger Brown, artist, member of the Chicago Imagists (Hamilton)
 Paul "Bear" Bryant, iconic coach of Alabama football, born in Camden, Arkansas (Tuscaloosa)
 John Hall Buchanan Jr., representative from Alabama's 6th congressional district (1965–1981) (Birmingham and thereafter Bethesda, Maryland)
 Jimmy Buffett, singer-songwriter (Mobile), born in Pascagoula, Mississippi
 Bill Burgess, college football head coach, Jacksonville State (Birmingham)
 Edward M. Burgess, chemist (Birmingham), inventor of the Burgess reagent
 Edward A. Burkhalter, admiral, United States Navy, Chief of Naval Intelligence, Chief of Staff, Defense Intelligence Agency (Roanoke)
 Brett Butler, actress (Montgomery)
 Keith Butler, NFL coach, Pittsburgh Steelers (Anniston)
 Pat Buttram, actor (Addison)
 Larry Byrom, rock music guitarist, Steppenwolf (Huntsville)

C

 Matt Cain, baseball player, San Francisco Giants (Dothan)
 Antoine Caldwell, NFL player, Houston Texans (Montgomery)
 Sonny Callahan, representative from Alabama's 1st congressional district (1985–2003) (Mobile)
 Julia Campbell, actress (Huntsville)
 Eli Capilouto, twelfth president of the University of Kentucky (Montgomery)
 Truman Capote, author of In Cold Blood, born in Louisiana (Monroeville)
 Robert Daniel Carmichael, mathematician (born in Goodwater)
 Edward Earl Carnes, judge, United States Court of Appeals for the Eleventh Circuit (Albertville)
 DeMarre Carroll, NBA player, Brooklyn Nets (Birmingham)
 Clarence Carter, soul singer and musician (Montgomery)
 Forrest Carter, writer
 Jonathan Carter, former NFL player (Anniston)
 Nell Carter, actress, singer (Birmingham)
 George Washington Carver, scientist, botanist, born in Diamond, Missouri (Tuskegee) 
 Herman Frank Cash, white supremacist and co-conspirator in the 16th Street Baptist Church bombing (Birmingham)
 Tim Castille, NFL player, Kansas City Chiefs (Birmingham)
 Reg E. Cathey, actor (Huntsville)
 Quinton Caver, former NFL player (Anniston)
 Robert Edward Chambliss, white supremacist and co-conspirator in the 16th Street Baptist Church bombing (Birmingham)
 Hosea Chanchez, actor (Montgomery)
 Josh Chapman, NFL defensive lineman, Indianapolis Colts (Hoover)
 Teresa Cheatham, Miss Alabama 1978 (Wellington)
 Elaine Cheris (born 1946), Olympic fencer
 Bobby Frank Cherry, white supremacist and co-conspirator in the 16th Street Baptist Church bombing (Birmingham)
 Fred Child, host of American Public Media's Performance Today (Huntsville)
 Mark Childress, writer (Monroeville)
 Stewart Cink, professional golfer (Huntsville)
 Bill Clark, college football head coach, University of Alabama (Piedmont)
 Bob Clark, actor, director, screenwriter (Birmingham)
 Jeremy Clark, NFL player, Dallas Cowboys (Daphne)
 Mattie Moss Clark, gospel artist, mother of gospel group The Clark Sisters (Selma)
 Clever, rapper (Gadsden)
 Nat King Cole, singer (Montgomery)
 Ronnie Coleman, football player, Alabama A&M and NFL's Houston Oilers (Jasper)
 Marva Collins, educator (Monroeville)
 Commodores, funk/soul band (Tuskegee, Alabama)
 Fred Cone, football player for Clemson and NFL's Green Bay Packers, Dallas Cowboys (Pine Apple)
 Bull Connor, politician who opposed the activities of the Civil Rights Movement (Selma)
 Jared Cook, NFL player, St. Louis Rams (Birmingham)
 Jeff Cook, country music guitarist, Alabama (Fort Payne)
 Timothy Cook, CEO of Apple Inc. (Robertsdale)
 Algernon J. Cooper, former Mayor of Prichard, Alabama (Mobile)
 Charles J. Cooper, former Assistant United States Attorney General (Birmingham)
 Miles Copeland Jr., musician, CIA officer (Birmingham)
 Jerricho Cotchery, NFL player, Carolina Panthers (Birmingham)
 DeMarcus Cousins, basketball player, Golden State Warriors (Mobile)
 Dennis Covington, author (Birmingham)
 Courteney Cox, actress (Mountain Brook)
 Tony Cox, actor (Uniontown)
 Clayne Crawford, actor (Clay)
 Rick Crawford, NASCAR Craftsman Truck Series driver (Mobile)
 Julia Pleasants Creswell, poet, novelist (Huntsville)
 Howard Cross, football player for Alabama and NFL's New York Giants (Owens Cross Roads)
 Ashley Crow, actress (Birmingham)
 Brodie Croyle, NFL player, Kansas City Chiefs (Rainbow City)
 Korey Cunningham, NFL player, New England Patriots (Montevallo)
 Michael Curry, NBA coach, Philadelphia 76ers (Anniston)

D 
 Marcell Dareus, NFL player, Buffalo Bills (Birmingham)
 Angela Davis, communist activist (Birmingham)
 Artur Davis, representative from Alabama's 7th congressional district (2003–2011) (Birmingham)
 Mollie Evelyn Moore Davis, poet, writer, educator (Talladega)
 N. Jan Davis, astronaut, born in Cocoa Beach, Florida (Huntsville)
 Russ Davis, baseball player (Birmingham)
 Tae Davis, NFL player, New York Giants (Oxford)
 Felicia Day, actress, writer, director, violinist, and singer (Huntsville)
 Joe Dawson, American-Israeli basketball player, 1992 Israeli Basketball Premier League MVP
 Grant Dayton, baseball player (Huntsville)
 Oscar Stanton De Priest, U.S. Congressman from Illinois, civil rights advocate (Florence)
 Morris Dees, founder of Southern Poverty Law Center (Montgomery)
 Sam Dees, soul music singer (Birmingham)
 Diana DeGarmo, American Idol contestant (Birmingham)
 David L. DeJarnette, influential archaeologist (Bessemer)
 Jeremiah Denton, prisoner of war in Vietnam, U.S. Senator (1981–1987) (Mobile)
 Donna D'Errico, actress (Dothan)
 James Deshler, Confederate brigadier general (Tuscumbia)
 Quinton Dial, NFL player, San Francisco 49ers (Andalusia)
 Kim Dickens, actress (Huntsville)
 Chris Dickerson, bodybuilder (Montgomery)
 Mahala Ashley Dickerson, lawyer (Montgomery)
 Parnell Dickinson, NFL quarterback, Tampa Bay Buccaneers (Brighton)
 William Louis Dickinson, representative from Alabama's 2nd congressional district (1965 to 1993) (Montgomery)
 Oliver W. Dillard, military leader (Margaret)
 Larry Dixon, state representative and state senator, Oklahoma native (Montgomery)
 Larry Donnell, football player, New York Giants (Ozark)
 Vince Dooley, football coach (Mobile)
 Nic Dowd, ice hockey player (Huntsville)
 Deidre Downs, 2005 Miss America (Pelham)
 John Drew, NBA player, Atlanta Hawks Utah Jazz (Vredenburgh)
 DSharp, violinist, DJ (Anniston)
 Erwin Dudley, basketball player (Uniontown)
 Benjamin Minge Duggar, botanist, discoverer of tetracycline (Gallion)
 Luther Duncan, 4-H pioneer, educator and administrator (Auburn)
 Alan Dunn, MLB bullpen coach, Baltimore Orioles (Gadsden)

E
 Bobby Eaton, pro wrestler (Huntsville)
 Annie Easley, mathematician and rocket scientist (Birmingham)
 Cleveland Eaton, jazz bassist (Birmingham)
 Dennis Edwards, soul music singer (Birmingham)
 Jack Edwards, state representative (1965–85) (Mobile)
 Joe F. Edwards Jr., astronaut, born in Richmond, Virginia (Roanoke and Lineville)
 Carl Elliott, state representative (1949–65) (Jasper)
 Jake Elmore, MLB player, Tampa Bay Rays (Pleasant Grove)
 Trae Elston, football player (Anniston)
 Eric Esch, a.k.a. Butterbean, boxer (Jasper)
 James Reese Europe, bandleader, composer (Mobile)
 Rodney J. Evans, Medal of Honor winner (Florala)
 Terry Everett, state representative (1993–09) (Enterprise)

F

 Nick Fairley, NFL defensive lineman, St. Louis Rams (Mobile)
 Red Farmer, former NASCAR driver (Hueytown)
 Paul Finebaum, columnist, author, radio personality, born in Memphis 
 Howard Finster, folk artist (Valley Head)
 Zelda Fitzgerald, writer (Montgomery)
 Fannie Flagg, author and actress (Birmingham)
 Louise Fletcher, Oscar-winning actress (Birmingham)
 Richmond Flowers Jr., football player (Dothan) 
 Richmond Flowers, Sr., attorney general and activist (Dothan)
 Trey Flowers, NFL defensive end, New England Patriots (Huntsville) 
 Vonetta Flowers, Olympic gold medalist in bobsled, 2002 Salt Lake City Olympics (Birmingham) 
 Wayne Flynt, editor-in-chief of Encyclopedia of Alabama (Auburn)
 Emory Folmar, mayor of Montgomery (1977–1999), Republican gubernatorial nominee in 1982 (Montgomery)
 James Folsom Jr., governor (1993–1995), lieutenant governor (1987–1993 and 2007–2011) (Cullman)
 Jim Folsom, governor (1947–1951 and 1955–1959) (Cullman)
 Dee Ford, NFL player, Kansas City Chiefs (Odenville)
 Joe Forehand, CEO of First Data (Alexander City)
 George Foster, MLB player (Tuscaloosa)
 Reuben Foster, NFL player, Washington Football Team (Roanoke)
 Jalston Fowler, NFL player, Tennessee Titans (Mobile)
 Melvin Franklin, soul music singer (Montgomery)
 Chris Fryar, drummer for Zac Brown Band (Birmingham)

G

 Noah Galloway, former United States Army soldier and contestant on Dancing with the Stars season 20 (Birmingham)
 Oscar Gamble, Major League Baseball outfielder (Ramer)
 Pat Garrett, sheriff of Lincoln County, New Mexico, killed Billy the Kid (Cusseta)
 A.G. Gaston, businessman, civil rights activist (Birmingham)
 Betty Lou Gerson, voice actress, "Cruella de Vil" of One Hundred and One Dalmatians (Birmingham)
 Charles Ghigna, poet, author (Homewood)
 Robert Gibbs, press secretary for President Barack Obama (Auburn)
 Kenneth A. Gibson, first black mayor of major eastern city (Newark, New Jersey, 1970–1986) (Enterprise)
 Kenneth R. Giddens, director of Voice of America, TV and radio station founder (Pine Apple)
 Wallace Gilberry, NFL defensive end, Cincinnati Bengals (Bay Minette)
 Horace Gillom, NFL player, Cleveland Browns (Roanoke)
 Samuel Ginn, pioneer in wireless communications industry (Anniston)
 Brian Ginsberg (born 1966), gymnast, two-time US junior national gymnastics champion
 Mark Gitenstein, former U.S. Ambassador to Romania (Florala)
 Mickell Gladness, NBA player, Miami Heat (Sylacauga)
 Harvey Glance, track and field athlete (Phenix City)
 Walton Goggins, actor (Birmingham)
 Eli Gold, sportscaster, born in New York (Birmingham)
 William Lee Golden, country music singer, The Oak Ridge Boys (East Brewton)
 Bobby Goldsboro, singer (Dothan)
 Tina Gordon, NASCAR driver (Cedar Bluff)
 William C. Gorgas, U. S. Army Surgeon General (Mobile)
 Vern Gosdin, country and gospel singer (Woodland)
 Mike Gottfried, former college football coach, ESPN commentator (Mobile)
 Charles Graddick, judge and Attorney General of Alabama (1975–1983) (Mobile)
 Beth Grant, actress (Gadsden)
 John Grass, college football coach, Jacksonville State University (Ashville)
 Kendall Graveman, MLB player, Oakland A's (Alexander City)
 Chris Gray, NFL player (Homewood)
 Floride Green, photographer (Eutaw or Mobile)
 Hank Green, vlogger and musician (Birmingham)
 Leamon Green, visual artist (Anniston)
 Urbie Green, jazz trombonist (Mobile)
 Frances Nimmo Greene, educator and author (Tuscaloosa)
 Kevin Greene, NFL player (Anniston), born in Schenectady, New York
 Rusty Greer, MLB player, Texas Rangers (Albertville)
 John Grenier, Republican politician (Birmingham)
 Parker Griffith, representative from Alabama's 5th congressional district (2009–2011) (Huntsville)
 David G. Grimes, insurance agent, Republican politician (Montgomery)
 Dexter Grimsley, Alabama House of Representative since 2010 (Abbeville)
 Steve Grissom, NASCAR driver (Gadsden)
 Winston Groom, author of Forrest Gump (Fairhope)
 Gabe Gross, MLB player, Oakland A's (Dothan)
 Lafayette Guild, pioneer in research of yellow fever (Tuscaloosa)
 Marquies Gunn, former NFL player (Alexander City)
 Annabelle Gurwitch, actress (Mobile)

H

 Rick Hall, record producer (Muscle Shoals)
 Mary Katharine Ham, journalist, video blogger, Fox News contributor (Montgomery)
 Mia Hamm, soccer player, Olympic and World Cup champion (Selma)
 Chris Hammond, MLB pitcher (Vestavia Hills)
 Cully Hamner, comic book artist and writer
 Lionel Hampton, jazz musician (Birmingham)
 Jon Hand, football player (Sylacauga)
 W. C. Handy, jazz composer (Florence)
 Charley Hannah, former NFL player (Albertville)
 John Hannah, Hall of Fame football player, Alabama and NFL's New England Patriots, born in Georgia (Albertville)
 John M. Harbert, billionaire businessman (construction, investments, coal mining properties) (Mountain Brook)
 Marguerite Harbert, billionaire heiress (Mountain Brook)
 George Hardy, actor, Troll 2 (Alexander City)
 James Harman, singer (Anniston)
 Roman Harper, NFL player, Carolina Panthers (Prattville)
 Emmylou Harris, singer (Birmingham)
 William R. Harvey, president of Hampton University (Brewton)
 Gustav Hasford, writer, screenwriter (Russellville)
 Erskine Hawkins, jazz composer (Birmingham)
 George C. Hawkins, member of both houses of the Alabama legislature (Gadsden)
 Alexander T. Hawthorn, Confederate States Army general (Conecuh County)
 Glenn Hearn, mayor of Huntsville, Alabama, FBI special agent, Alabama legislator (Albertville)
 Howell Heflin, Chief Justice, Alabama Supreme Court, United States Senator (1979–1997), born in Poulan, Georgia (Tuscumbia) 
 Kurt Heinecke, music composer, songwriter, voice actor, photographer (Cullman) 
 John S. Hendricks, founder, chair and CEO of Discovery Networks (Huntsville)
 Richard Hendrix, basketball player (Athens)
 Alexis Herman, former Secretary of Labor (Mobile)
 Will Herring, NFL player, New Orleans Saints (Opelika)
 Jake Hess, gospel quartet singer (Haleyville)
 Taylor Hicks, singer, American Idol winner 2006 (Hoover)
 Harlon Hill, football player, Chicago Bears (Killen)
 Howard Hill, professional archer and stunt archer for films (Wilsonville)
 J. Lister Hill, United States Senator (1938–1969) (Montgomery)
 Sammie Lee Hill, football player, Detroit Lions (West Blocton)
 Joe Hilley, author (Grand Bay)
 Brent Hinds, singer, guitarist, Mastodon (Pelham)
 Eddie Hinton, musician (Birmingham)
 Sylvia Hitchcock, Miss USA and Miss Universe 1967 (Tuscaloosa)
 Chandler Hoffman, Major League Soccer player, Los Angeles Galaxy (Birmingham)
 Robert Hoffman, actor (Madison)
 Bill Holbrook, syndicated comic strip artist (Huntsville)
 Mitch Holleman, actor, Reba (Auburn)
 Lonnie Holley, artist (Birmingham)
 Polly Holliday, actress (Jasper)
 Fred Nall Hollis, artist (Troy)
 Condredge Holloway, CFL player (Huntsville)
 Hardcore Holly, WWE star (Mobile)
 Cliff Holman, television personality (Mobile)
 Evander Holyfield, World Heavyweight Championship boxer (Atmore)
 Perry O. Hooper Jr., member of the Alabama House of Representatives 1984–2003 (Montgomery)
 Perry O. Hooper, Sr., former chief justice of the Alabama Supreme Court, first Republican to hold that office (Montgomery)
 Robert Horry, basketball player (Andalusia)
 Hunter Horton, disc golf player (Chelsea)
 Frank House, baseball player and legislator (Bessemer)
 Brittany Howard, musician (Athens, Alabama)
 Jordan Howard, football player (Gardendale)
 Linda Howard, romance writer (Gadsden)
 Glenn Howerton, actor (Montgomery)
 Freeman A. Hrabowski III, academic, university president (Birmingham)
 Cooper Huckabee, actor (Mobile)
 Delvin Lamar Hughley, former football player, Colorado Crush (Anniston)
 William Bradford Huie, journalist, author (Hartselle)
 Bobby Humphrey, former NFL player (Birmingham)
 Guy Hunt, governor (1987–1993) (Cullman)
 Alan Hunter, original MTV VeeJay (Birmingham)
 Zora Neale Hurston, author (Notasulga)

I
 Osmond Kelly Ingram, Gunner's Mate First Class, U.S. Navy, WWI Medal of Honor recipient (Oneonta)
 Kay Ivey, politician and current governor (Camden)

J

 Bo Jackson, multi-sport athlete (Bessemer)
 Kate Jackson, actress (Birmingham)
 Katherine Jackson, mother of the Jackson 5 (Barbour County)
 Tarvaris Jackson, NFL player (Montgomery)
 Henry James, former NBA player
 Sonny James, country music singer (Hackleburg)
 Mae C. Jemison, astronaut (Decatur)
 Desmond Jennings, MLB player, Tampa Bay Rays (Birmingham)
 Jerrel Jernigan, NFL player, New York Giants (Eufaula)
 Brandon Johnson, former NFL player (Birmingham)
 Frank Minis Johnson, federal judge (Haleyville)
 Jamey Johnson, country music singer (Montgomery)
 Lonnie Johnson, inventor (Mobile)
 Michael Johnson, NFL player, Cincinnati Bengals (Selma)
 Nico Johnson, former NFL player (Andalusia)
 Rashad Johnson, NFL defensive back, Arizona Cardinals (Sulligent)
 Samuel E. Johnson, businessman (Birmingham)
 Christion Jones, football player (Adamsville)
 Dean Jones, actor (Decatur)
 Don Jones, NFL player, San Francisco 49ers (Town Creek, Alabama)
 Julio Jones, NFL player, Atlanta Falcons (Foley)
 Orlando Jones, actor (Mobile)
 Robbie Jones, NFL player, New York Giants (Demopolis)
 Walter Jones, NFL Hall of Famer, Seattle Seahawks (Aliceville)
 Lee Roy Jordan, football player, Alabama and NFL's Dallas Cowboys (Excel)
 Ralph "Shug" Jordan, football coach, Auburn University (Selma)
 Tom Joyner, radio personality (Tuskegee)
 Percy Lavon Julian, research chemist (Montgomery)

K

 Helen Keller, author and activist (Tuscumbia)
 Eddie Kendricks, soul music singer (Union Springs)
 Jimmy Key, MLB pitcher (Huntsville)
 Caitlín R. Kiernan, author (Birmingham)
 Craig Kimbrel, MLB pitcher, Atlanta Braves (Huntsville)
 Alveda King, minister, anti-abortion activist, author (Birmingham)
 Brandon King, NFL safety, New England Patriots (Alabaster)
 Coretta Scott King, civil rights leader (Marion)
 Martin Luther King Jr., civil rights activist, lived in Alabama in the mid-1950s (Montgomery)
 Reggie King, former NBA player (Birmingham)
 Troy King, state attorney general (2004–2011) (Montgomery) 
 William R. King, United States Senator from Alabama (1848–1852), 13th Vice President under President Franklin Pierce (1853–1853) (born in Sampson County, North Carolina)
 Woodie King Jr., director, producer (Baldwin Springs)
 Dre Kirkpatrick, NFL cornerback, Cincinnati Bengals (Gadsden)
 Freddie Kitchens, University of Alabama quarterback, NFL head coach of Cleveland Browns (Gadsden)
 Corey Kluber, MLB pitcher, Cleveland Indians (Birmingham)
 Mathew Knowles, father of Beyoncé and Solange (Gadsden)
 Simmie Knox, painter (Aliceville)
 David Koonce, rock musician, Within Reason (Pelham)

L

 Larry Langford, former mayor of Birmingham (Birmingham)
 Adam Lazzara, singer, Taking Back Sunday (Sheffield)
 Terry Leach, MLB pitcher (Selma)
 Harper Lee, Pulitzer Prize-winning writer of To Kill a Mockingbird (Monroeville)
 Perry Lentz, author (Anniston)
 Lash LeRoux, professional wrestler, painter, artist (Oxford)
 Leon Lett, NFL defensive tackle (Fairhope)
 Carl Lewis, track and field athlete, Olympic gold medalist (Birmingham)
 David Peter Lewis, governor (1872–1874) (Huntsville)
 John Lewis, U.S. Congressman, civil rights leader (Troy)
 Monte Lewis, football player (Abbeville)
 George Lindsey, actor (Jasper)
 Angela Little, model, actress, Playboy Playmate of the Month (Albertville)
 Tandy Little, Republican member of the Alabama House of Representatives (1962–1966), real estate developer (Montgomery)
 Herman H. Long, college administrator (Birmingham)
 Theodore Long, professional wrestling authority figure (Birmingham)
 Sarah Ashley Longshore, painter
 Joe Louis, boxer, 12-year world heavyweight champion (Lafayette)
 Fred L. Lowery, Southern Baptist clergyman and author (Montevallo)
 Joseph Lowery, civil rights leader (Huntsville)
 Theodore J. Lowi, political scientist (Gadsden)
 Rebecca Luker, singer and actress (Helena)
 Shelby Lynne, country music singer, born in Virginia (Frankville)

M

 Sunny Mabrey, model, actress (Gadsden)
 Harry Mabry, television newscaster (Birmingham)
 Everette Maddox  "Rhett" Maddox, poet (Montgomery)
 Anthony Madison, NFL player, Pittsburgh Steelers (Thomasville)
 Boots Mallory, actress (Mobile)
 Alfred Malone, NFL player, Houston Texans (Frisco City)
 Gucci Mane, musician (Birmingham)
 William March, writer, World War I hero (Mobile)
 Sharon G. Markette, Illinois state representative, Montgomery
 Sen'Derrick Marks, NFL player, Jacksonville Jaguars (Mobile)
 Debra Marshall, WWE wrestler (Tuscaloosa)
 Kerry James Marshall, artist (Birmingham)
 Chris Martin, NFL player (Huntsville)
 Harold E. Martin, newspaperman (Montgomery)
 Hugh Martin, songwriter (Birmingham)
 James D. Martin, U.S. representative from Alabama's 7th congressional district (1965 to 1967) (Gadsden) 
 Sonequa Martin-Green, actress (Russellville)
 F. David Mathews, educator (Grove Hill)
 Evan Mathis, NFL player, Denver Broncos (Birmingham)
 Jordan Matthews, NFL player, Philadelphia Eagles (Madison)
 Bruce Maxwell, MLB player (Huntsville)
 Kivuusama Mays, former NFL player (Anniston)
 Willie Mays, Hall of Fame center fielder (Birmingham)
 Lewis McAllister, businessman and Republican former member of the Mississippi House of Representatives (Tuscaloosa)
 Jim McBride, songwriter (Huntsville)
 Robert R. McCammon, horror writer (Birmingham)
 A. J. McCarron, football quarterback (Mobile)
 Elvin McCary, politician (Anniston)
 Antoine McClain, former NFL player (Anniston)
 Rolando McClain, NFL player, Dallas Cowboys (Athens)
 Mary Sue McClurkin, Alabama House of Representatives 1998–2014 (Abbeville)
 Mitch McConnell, politician, long-time U.S. Senator from Kentucky since 1985, and Republican Leader of the United States Senate 2015–2021 (Sheffield/Athens)
 Willie McCovey, Hall of Fame first baseman (Mobile)
 Michael McCullers, screenwriter
 K. J. McDaniels, NBA player (Birmingham)
 Alexander McGillivray, Creek Indian Chief (Montgomery)
 Lachlan McGillivray, Scots-Indian trader (Montgomery)
 Garnie W. McGinty, Louisiana historian (Montevallo)
 Joe McInnes, corporate and state executive (Wetumpka)
 Frank McIntyre, U.S. Army general (Montgomery)
 Ronald McKinnon, NFL player, Arizona Cardinals (Elba)
 Steve McLendon, NFL player, Pittsburgh Steelers (Ozark)
 Gertrude Michael, actress (Talladega)
 Chuckie Miller, former NFL player (Anniston)
 Don Mincher, MLB player (Huntsville)
 Grover Mitchell, jazz trombonist (Whatley)
 John Mitchell, NFL coach, Pittsburgh Steelers (Mobile)
 Anthony Mix, NFL player (Bay Minette)
 Wilmer Mizell, U.S. representative from North Carolina, Major League Baseball pitcher (Vinegar Bend)
 Jamario Moon, basketball player (Goodwater)
 Charles Moore, civil rights photojournalist (Hackleburg)
 Mal Moore, University of Alabama athletic director, former quarterback and offensive coordinator (Dozier)
 Roy Moore, chief justice of the Alabama Supreme Court (2001–2003, 2013–2016) (Gadsden)
 Thomas Hinman Moorer, admiral, U.S. Navy, Chairman of the Joint Chiefs of Staff (Mount Willing)
 Kathryn Morgan, ballet dancer, former soloist with New York City Ballet
 Lamar Morris, country singer (Andalusia)
 Randall Morris, former NFL player, Seattle Seahawks (Anniston)
 C. J. Mosley, NFL player, Baltimore Ravens (Mobile)
 Eric Motley, public administrator (Montgomery)
 Morgan Murphy, humorist and author (Mountain Brook)
 Roger Murrah, songwriter, recording artist (Athens)
 Albert Murray, writer (Nokomis)
 Johnny Musso, football player (Birmingham)
 Pete Myers, basketball player and coach (Mobile)

N

 Jim Nabors, actor and singer (Sylacauga)
 Joe Namath, Hall of Fame quarterback, Alabama and NFL player, born in Beaver Falls, Pennsylvania (Tuscaloosa)
 Siran Neal, NFL player, Buffalo Bills (Dothan)
 Larry Nelson, PGA golfer (Fort Payne)
 Bert Nettles, politician and lawyer, formerly from Monroeville and Mobile (Birmingham)
 Elijah Nevett, NFL player (Bessemer)
 Ozzie Newsome, football player, Alabama and NFL's Cleveland Browns, executive for Baltimore Ravens (Leighton)
 Matthew Newton, conductor, professional railroader (Prattville)
 Jimmy Nolen, guitarist (Roanoke)

O

 Philip Ober, stage and screen actor (Fort Payne)
 Benjamin Obomanu, NFL player, Seattle Seahawks (Selma)
 Scott Oden, writer (Somerville)
 Cathy O'Donnell, actress (Siluria)
 Spooner Oldham, songwriter, keyboardist (Center Star)
 Stan O'Neal, chairman and CEO of Merrill Lynch (Roanoke)
 Katherine Orrison, screenwriter (Anniston)
 Osceola, Seminole leader (Tallassee)
 Victoria Osteen, co-pastor of Lakewood Church (Huntsville)
 Randy Owen, lead singer for band Alabama (Fort Payne)
 Jesse Owens, iconic track and field athlete, Olympic gold medalist (Oakville)
 Terrell Owens, NFL Hall of Famer (Alexander City)

P

 Satchel Paige, baseball player (Mobile)
 Michael Papajohn, actor, stuntman (Vestavia Hills)
 Rosa Parks, civil rights activist (Tuskegee)
 Gail Patrick, actress and television producer (Birmingham)
 Albert Patterson, Attorney General of Alabama (Phenix City)
 John Malcolm Patterson, Governor of Alabama (Phenix City)
 Jake Peavy, baseball pitcher (Mobile)
 Charley Pell, head football coach at Clemson and Florida (Albertville)
 Dan Penn, singer, songwriter, record producer (Vernon)
 Blake Percival, Whistleblower (Montgomery)
 Walker Percy, author (Birmingham)
 Tito Perdue, author (Anniston)
 Wayne Perkins musician (Birmingham)
 Chuck Person, NBA player (Brantley)
 Wesley Person, NBA player (Brantley)
 Jesse Lee Peterson, minister, author (Midway)
 Sidney Phillips, World War II veteran, physician (Mobile)
 Wilson Pickett, R&B and soul singer (Prattville)
 Juan Pierre, MLB outfielder (Mobile)
 Charles Redding Pitt, attorney, politician (Decatur)
 Adrian Pledger (born 1976), basketball player
 Willie Pless, CFL Hall of Famer, Edmonton Eskimos Anniston, Alabama|Anniston]])
 Nathan Poole, former NFL player (Alexander City)
 Chris Porter, NBA player (Abbeville)
 Monica Potter, actress (Arab)
 Paula Poundstone, comedian (Huntsville)
 Alma Powell, audiologist, children's author (Birmingham)
 Michael Powell, attorney and politician (Birmingham)
 Jerraud Powers, NFL player, Arizona Cardinals (Decatur)
 Tyrone Prothro, football player, Alabama (Heflin)
 Jeremy Pruitt, college football coach, University of Tennessee (Rainsville)

Q
 I. T. Quinn, conservationist, one of the founders of the National Wildlife Federation (Belgreen)

R

 Sun Ra, jazz musician (Birmingham)
 Sam Raben (born 1997), soccer player
 Anthony Radetic, professional water skier (Abbeville)
 Max Rafferty, California Superintendent of Public Instruction (1963–1971), education dean at Troy University (Troy)
 Thom S. Rainer, writer (Union Springs)
 Howell Raines, former New York Times editor (Birmingham)
 Albert Rains, representative of Alabama's 7th congressional district (1945–1965) (Gadsden) 
 Geoff Ramsey, voice actor and producer for Rooster Teeth Productions (Mobile)
 LaJuan Ramsey, former NFL player (Anniston)
 Levi Randolph (born 1992), basketball player for Hapoel Jerusalem of the Israeli Basketball Premier League
 Theo Ratliff, former center for the Charlotte Bobcats (Demopolis)
 Ray Reach, jazz pianist, vocalist, arranger, composer, music producer, Director of Student Jazz Programs for the Alabama Jazz Hall of Fame (Birmingham)
 Gary Redus, baseball player (Decatur)
 Margaret Renkl, writer (Birmingham)
 Scottie Reynolds, basketball player at Villanova
 Condoleezza Rice, former United States Secretary of State (Birmingham)
 Rich Boy, rapper (Mobile)
 Al Richardson, former NFL player, Atlanta Falcons (Abbeville)
 Tony Richardson, NFL player, New York Jets (Daleville)
 Lionel Richie, singer, composer, instrumentalist, producer, and four-time Grammy award winner (Tuskegee)
 Bob Riley, Governor of Alabama (2003–2011) (Ashland)
 Chris Richards, soccer player (Birmingham)
 Alex Ríos, MLB outfielder (Coffee County)
 Philip Rivers, quarterback for NFL's San Diego Chargers and North Carolina State University (Decatur)
 Robin Roberts, broadcaster on ABC's Good Morning America (Tuskegee)
 David Robertson, pitcher for the New York Yankees (Birmingham)
 Denard Robinson, NFL player, Jacksonville Jaguars (Birmingham)
 Martha Roby, representative from Alabama's 2nd congressional district (2011–2021) (Montgomery)
 Chester Rogers, NFL wide receiver (Huntsville)
 Jim Rogers, businessman, investor (Demopolis)
 Roy Rogers, former NBA player, assistant coach for the Houston Rockets (Linden)
 Wayne Rogers, actor (Birmingham)
 Michael Rooker, actor (Jasper)
 Frank Rose, educator, former President of the University of Alabama (Tuscaloosa)
 Marie Rudisill, a.k.a. "The Fruitcake Lady," Truman Capote's aunt (Monroeville) 
 Council Rudolph, former NFL player (Anniston)
 Grayson Russell, actor, Diary of a Wimpy Kid (Clanton)
 Jeff Rutledge, NFL quarterback (Birmingham)
 Josh Rutledge, MLB infielder (Cullman)
 Debby Ryan, actress (Huntsville)
 DeMeco Ryans, NFL player, Philadelphia Eagles (Bessemer)

S

 Warren St. John, author, journalist (Birmingham)
 Ed Salem, football player, born in Tucson, Arizona (Birmingham)
 Charles E. Samuels Jr., 8th director of the United States Federal Bureau of Prisons (Birmingham)
 Chris Samuels, former NFL player for Washington Redskins (Mobile)
 Sonia Sanchez, poet (Birmingham)
 John Solomon Sandridge, painter, sculptor, author, born in Gadsden, Alabama (Chelsea) 
 David Satcher, Surgeon General of the United States, second ever and first African-America four-star admiral in United States Public Health Service Commissioned Corps (Anniston)
 Eugene Sawyer, 53rd mayor of Chicago (Greensboro)
 Bo Scarbrough, NFL player, Detroit Lions (Tuscaloosa)
 Beverly Jo Scott, singer and coach on The Voice Belgique (Deer Park)
 Richard M. Scrushy, founder and former CEO of HealthSouth (Selma)
 Doc Scurlock, a.k.a. Josiah Gordon Scurlock, a founding member of the Lincoln County New Mexico Regulators, member of Billy the Kid's gang (Tallapoosa)
 Jay Sebring, hair stylist, Charles Manson murder victim (Birmingham)
 Waldo Semon, inventor of vinyl (Demopolis)
 David Sessions, member of the Alabama Legislature (Grand Bay)
 Jeff Sessions, longtime Alabama Senator 1997–2017; U.S. Attorney General
 Joe Sewell, baseball player (Titus)
 Luke Sewell, baseball player (Titus)
 Rip Sewell, baseball player (Decatur)
 Glenn Shadix, actor (Bessemer)
 Earnie Shavers, former heavyweight boxer (Garland)
 Tommy Shaw, rock musician (Montgomery)
 Richard C. Shelby, United States Senator (Birmingham)
 Ashton Shepherd, country singer (Coffeeville)
 Danny Sheridan, sports broadcaster and prognosticator (Mobile)
 Fred Shuttlesworth, civil rights activist (Birmingham)
 George Siebels, mayor of Birmingham (1967–1975), state representative (1975–1990) (Birmingham)
 Don Siegelman, former governor of Alabama (1999–2003) (Mobile)
 Eugene Sledge, World War II veteran, teacher, writer (Mobile)
 Percy Sledge, soul singer (Leighton)
 Kirby Smart, football coach, defensive coordinator University of Alabama (Montgomery)
 Rickey Smiley, comedian (Birmingham)
 Albert Lee Smith Jr., representative from Alabama's 6th congressional district (1981–1983) (Birmingham)
 Andre Smith, NFL offensive lineman, Cincinnati Bengals (Birmingham)
 Ella Gaunt Smith, doll manufacturer (Roanoke)
 Holland Smith, general, United States Marine Corps during World War II, father of amphibious warfare (Hatchechubbie)
 Johnny Smith, jazz guitarist (Birmingham)
 Leighton W. Smith Jr., admiral, United States Navy (Mobile)
 Ozzie Smith, Hall of Fame baseball player (Mobile)
 Patrick "j.Que" Smith, songwriter (Anniston)
 Tremon Smith, NFL player, Indianapolis Colts (Saks)
 Zeke Smith, football player (Uniontown)
 Les Snead, general manager of the St. Louis Rams (Eufaula)
 Dylan Riley Snyder, actor, singer (Tuscaloosa)
 James Spann, meteorologist, podcast host (Huntsville)
 John Sparkman, United States Senator (1946–1979) (Hartselle)
 Chauncey Sparks, governor (1943–1947) (Eufaula)
 Mark Spencer, president/CEO of Digium (Huntsville)
 Octavia Spencer, Academy Awards and Golden Globes award-winning actress (Montgomery)
 The Springs, band (Enterprise)
 Ken Stabler, NFL player, The University of Alabama and Oakland Raiders (Foley)
 Zac Stacy, NFL player, St. Louis Rams (Centreville)
 John Stallworth, NFL player, Pittsburgh Steelers (Tuscaloosa)
 Bart Starr, Hall of Fame football player, Alabama and Green Bay Packers (Montgomery)
 Elizabeth Willisson Stephen, writer, novelist, poet (Marengo County)
 Darian Stewart, NFL player, Denver Broncos (Huntsville)
 Donald W. Stewart, United States Senator (Anniston)
 Mike Stewart, author (Vredenburgh)
 Dwight Stone, former NFL player (Florala)
 Luther Strange, Attorney General of Alabama (2011–2017) (Mountain Brook)
 J. Curry Street, physicist (Opelika)
 T. S. Stribling, author (Florence)
 Gail Strickland, actress (Birmingham)
 Hut Stricklin, NASCAR driver (Calera)
 Ruben Studdard, 2003 American Idol winner (Birmingham)
 Jimmy Lee Sudduth, artist and blues musician (Fayette)
 Pat Sullivan, football player (Birmingham)
 Kevin Sumlin, football head coach, Texas A&M (Brewton)
 Don Sutton, Hall of Fame baseball player (Clio)
 Barret Swatek, actress and comedian (Birmingham)
 Ward Swingle, jazz arranger and composer (Mobile)
 Dabo Swinney, football head coach, Clemson (Pelham)

T

 Tua Tagovailoa, NFL player, Miami Dolphins (Alabaster)
 Jaquiski Tartt, NFL football player (Mobile)
 Channing Tatum, actor (Cullman)
 Toni Tennille, singer of the duo Captain and Tennille (Montgomery)
 Adalius Thomas, NFL football player (Equality)
 Bryan Thomas, football player (Birmingham)
 Fred Thompson, former United States senator from Tennessee, actor (Sheffield)
 Fresco Thompson, former major league baseball player and executive
 Myron Herbert Thompson, Senior United States District Judge
 Neil Thrasher, country singer-songwriter (Birmingham)
 Carson Tinker, NFL player, Jacksonville Jaguars (Decatur) 
 Frank Tipler, mathematical physicist and cosmologist (Andalusia)
 Andre Tippett (born 1959), NFL Hall of Fame football player (Birmingham)
 Mose Tolliver, artist (Pike Road)
 Harry Townes, actor (Huntsville)
 Pat Trammell, Alabama Crimson Tide football player, physician (Scottsboro)
 William Barret Travis, Commander of the Alamo at San Antonio, Texas (Claiborne)
 Jack Treadwell, World War II Medal of Honor winner (Ashland, Alabama)
 Justin Tuck, NFL football player (Kellyton)
 Cynthia Tucker, columnist and editor (Monroeville)
 Joe Turnham, chairman of the Alabama Democratic Party (2005–2011) (Auburn)
 Tom Turnipseed, Democratic political activist (Mobile)
 Chief Tuskaloosa, Creek Indian chief and leader
 Richard Tyson, actor (Mobile)

U 
 P. W. Underwood, football player and college coach (Cordova)
 Courtney Upshaw, NFL player, Atlanta Falcons (Eufaula)

V 
 Robert J. Van de Graaff, engineer, physicist (Tuscaloosa)
 Robert Smith Vance, federal judge (Talladega)
 Ed Vaughn, Michigan House of Representatives 1979–1980, 1995–2000 (Abbeville)
 Ned Vaughn, actor (Huntsville)
 Mack Vickery, singer, songwriter (Town Creek)
 Scottie Vines, former NFL player (Alexander City)
 Wernher von Braun, engineer, physicist (Huntsville) born in Wirsitz, Province of Posen, Poland (then part of German Empire)
 Hans A. von Spakovsky, attorney (Huntsville)

W 

 Mark Waid, writer (Hueytown)
 Jimmy Wales, co-founder of Wikipedia (Huntsville)
 Frank Walker, NFL player, Dallas Cowboys (Tuskegee)
 Margaret Walker, poet, author (Birmingham)
 Ben Wallace, NBA player (White Hall)
 Bubba Wallace, NASCAR driver (Mobile)
 Cornelia Wallace, second wife of George C. Wallace, First Lady of Alabama (1971–1978) (Montgomery)
 Daniel Wallace, writer (Birmingham)
 George C. Wallace, four-term governor and four-time presidential candidate (Clio and Montgomery)
 George Wallace Jr., former Alabama Public Service Commission member (Montgomery)
 Gerald Wallace, basketball player (Childersburg)
 Lurleen Burns Wallace, governor (1967–1968) (Montgomery)
 Eugene Walter, writer-actor (Mobile)
 Jimmie Ward, NFL player, San Francisco 49ers (Mobile)
 Kevin Ward, songwriter (Anniston)
 DeMarcus Ware, NFL player, Denver Broncos (Auburn)
 Adam Warren, MLB pitcher, New York Yankees (Birmingham)
 Mervyn Warren, musician (Huntsville)
 Dinah Washington, singer (Tuscaloosa)
 Mary Burke Washington, economist (Tuskegee)
 Ken Watters, jazz trumpeter (Huntsville)
 William Weatherford, a.k.a. Red Eagle, Creek Indian leader
 Joe Webb, NFL player, Carolina Panthers (Birmingham)
 Katherine Webb, model, Miss Alabama USA (Montgomery)
 Lardarius Webb, NFL player, Baltimore Ravens (Opelika)
 Fred Wesley, musician (Mobile)
 Mario West, NBA player, Atlanta Hawks (Huntsville)
 Joseph Wheeler, Confederate and US General, US Congressman, namesake of Wheeler State Park and Wheeler National Wildlife Refuge, author (Hillsboro)
 Chris White, NFL player, Buffalo Bills (Mobile)
 D. J. White, NBA player, Charlotte Bobcats (Tuscaloosa)
 Pat White, NFL player, Miami Dolphins (Daphne)
 Heather Whitestone, 1995 Miss America (Dothan)
 Chase Whitley, MLB player, New York Yankees (Ranburne)
 Joe Whitt Jr., NFL coach, Green Bay Packers (Auburn)
 Barbara Wiedemann, poet and English professor (Montgomery)
 Deontay Wilder, professional boxer (Tuscaloosa)
 Mark Wilkerson, musician (Enterprise)
 Billy Williams, Hall of Fame baseball player (Mobile)
 Carnell Williams, NFL player, Tampa Bay Buccaneers (Attalla)
 Cootie Williams, jazz trumpeter (Mobile)
 Hank Williams, country musician (Georgiana)
 Hank Williams Jr., country musician (Cullman)
 Holly Williams, country musician (Cullman)
 Lee Williams, professional golfer (Alexander City)
 Nick Williams, NFL player, Kansas City Chiefs (Birmingham)
 Paul Williams, soul singer (Birmingham)
 Josh Willingham, MLB left fielder, Kansas City Royals (Florence)
 James Willis, former NFL linebacker (Huntsville)
 E. O. Wilson, biologist and writer (Birmingham)
 Martha Loftin Wilson, missionary worker, educataor (Clarke County)
 Kathryn Tucker Windham, storyteller and author (Dallas County)
 Jameis Winston, NFL quarterback, Heisman Trophy winner (Bessemer) 
 Reynolds Wolf, meteorologist (Jemison)
 Tobias Wolff, author (Birmingham)
 Roy Wood Jr., stand-up comedian (Birmingham)
 Ray Woodard, "Father of soccer in Alabama" (Pelham)
 Tricia Woodgett, screenwriter (Anniston)
 Mark Woodyard, MLB pitcher, Detroit Tigers (Mobile)
 Wesley Wright, MLB pitcher, Baltimore Orioles (Montgomery)
 Tammy Wynette, country singer (Red Bay)

Y 
 YBN Nahmir, rapper (Birmingham)
 Yelawolf, rapper (Gadsden)
 T. J. Yeldon, running back (Daphne)
 Byron York, conservative political columnist (Birmingham)
 Tom York, television personality (Hoover)
 Coleman Young, former mayor of Detroit, Michigan (Tuscaloosa)
 Delmon Young, baseball player (Montgomery)
 Martevious Young, football player (Alexander City)

Z 
 John Zimmerman, professional pair skater and coach (Birmingham)

See also

By location
 List of people from Birmingham, Alabama
 List of people from Demopolis, Alabama
 List of people from Gadsden, Alabama
 List of people from Huntsville, Alabama
 List of people from Mobile, Alabama
 List of people from Montgomery, Alabama
 List of people from Selma, Alabama
 List of people from Tuskegee, Alabama

Other
 Alabama Academy of Honor
 List of Alabama suffragists

References